Thies Röpcke (born 20 July 1954) is a German former professional tennis player.

Röpcke, a national junior champion from Hamburg, was active on tour in the 1970s and reached a best singles world ranking of 272. He played an opening round match against Björn Borg at the 1974 Australian Open and took the first set in a tiebreak, then had a series of break points at 2–2 in the second set, before the Swede came back to win.

References

External links
 
 

1954 births
Living people
West German male tennis players
Tennis players from Hamburg